The men's javelin throw  at the 2018 IAAF World U20 Championships was held at Ratina Stadium on 13 and 14 July.

Records

Results

Qualification
The qualification round took place on 13 July, in two groups, with Group A starting at 09:30 and Group B starting at 10:45. Athletes attaining a mark of at least 72.00 metres( Q ) or at least the 12 best performers ( q ) qualified for the final.

Final
The final was held on 14 July at 15:24.

References

javelin throw
Javelin throw at the World Athletics U20 Championships